Phyllosticta platani is a fungal plant pathogen infecting plane trees. It is found in Eastern North America and Europe.

References

External links
 Index Fungorum
 USDA ARS Fungal Database

Fungal tree pathogens and diseases
platani
Fungi described in 1878